The Court of Appeal of New Zealand is the principal intermediate appellate court of New Zealand. It is also the final appellate court for a number of matters. In practice, most appeals are resolved at this intermediate appellate level, rather than in the Supreme Court. The Court of Appeal has existed as a separate court since 1862 but, until 1957, it was composed of judges of the High Court sitting periodically in panels. In 1957 the Court of Appeal was reconstituted as a permanent court separate from the High Court. It is located in Wellington.

The Court and its work 

The President and nine other permanent appellate judges constitute the full-time working membership of the Court of Appeal.

The court sits in panels of five judges and three judges, depending on the nature and wider significance of the particular case. A considerable number of three-judge cases are heard by Divisional Courts consisting of one permanent Court of Appeal judge and two High Court judges seconded for that purpose.

In the main, criminal appeals will be allocated to a Divisional Court unless the President otherwise directs. This recognises the insights which judges with current trial experience bring to criminal appeals. Counsel for the appellant or respondent may request a direction that a particular appeal be instead allocated to a Permanent Court or a Full Court.

Longer civil appeals or areas that raise legal issues of public significance will usually be allocated to a Permanent Court. Appeals from decisions of associate judges of the High Court and shorter civil appeals that raise mainly factual issues, usually will be allocated to a Divisional Court unless the President otherwise directs. Again counsel for the appellant or respondent may request a direction that a particular appeal be allocated to a Divisional Court, a Permanent Court, or a Full Court.

The President will also determine whether an appeal (criminal or civil) is of sufficient significance to warrant the consideration of a Full Court of five members. The President will, where appropriate, consult with other permanent judges.  Such a decision typically is made only once or twice a year.

How cases come to the court
The Court of Appeal deals with civil and criminal appeals from matters heard in the High Court, and serious criminal charges from the District Court. Matters appealed to the High Court from the District Court and certain tribunals can be taken to the Court of Appeal with leave, if a second appeal is warranted. The court may also grant leave to hear appeals against pre-trial rulings in criminal cases, and appeals on questions of law from the Employment Court. The court sits as a Permanent Court in Wellington in "sessions" lasting three weeks. These are followed by two "circuit" weeks, in which members of the Permanent Court either sit in Divisional Courts or else write judgments.  Divisional Courts are conducted on circuit – in the regions.  There are approximately forty Divisional Court weeks, divided into twenty in Auckland, sixteen in Wellington, two or three weeks in Christchurch and one week in Dunedin. The court maintains two courtrooms in Auckland, along with judges chambers. These are located in the heritage premises of the High Court building on Waterloo Quadrant, constructed in 1865-68. Appeals from the upper North Island are generally heard there, and appeals from the South Island are generally heard in Christchurch or Dunedin. But where urgency dictates, a divisional appeal will be heard in Wellington. On occasion the Permanent Court sits in Auckland, in cases of substantial local public interest.

Civil proceedings

The Court of Appeal (Civil) Rules 2005 set out the procedural requirements for pursuing civil appeals. The Court of Appeal has jurisdiction to hear and determine appeals from any judgment, decree or order of the High Court. Where the appeal to the Court of Appeal is itself an appeal from another court to the High Court, a further appeal to the Court of Appeal is available only if leave to appeal is given by the High Court or, where leave is refused by the High Court, by the Court of Appeal. Appeals on questions of law from the Employment Court can, with the leave of the Court of Appeal, be brought to the Court of Appeal.

Criminal proceedings
Any person convicted in the High Court or, on more serious charges, in the District Court may appeal to the Court of Appeal against the conviction, or the sentence passed on conviction, or both. The court has jurisdiction to hear appeals against pre-trial rulings in criminal cases. There is a right of appeal with respect to High Court decisions granting or refusing bail or in respect of conditions of bail.

The Court of Appeal (Criminal) Rules 2001 set out the procedural requirements for pursuing criminal appeals in the Court of Appeal. The Crimes Act 1961 and Criminal Procedure Act 2011 also contain both substantive and procedural provisions relevant to criminal appeals to the Court of Appeal.

An appeal or application for leave to appeal must be dealt with by way of a hearing involving oral submissions unless the judge or court making the decision on the mode of hearing determines that the appeal or application can be fairly dealt with on the papers.

Appellant in custody are not entitled to be present at a hearing involving oral submissions unless there is a legislative right to be present, or the Court of Appeal grants leave. Audio-visual links are often used by the court.

Judges of the Court of Appeal 

The current judges of the Court of Appeal are:

The current registrar of the court is Maryanne McKennie.

History of the Court of Appeal  
The Court of Appeal has existed since 1862.  Before the establishment of the Court of Appeal, appeals from High Court (then known as the Supreme Court) decisions were heard by the governor and members of the Executive Council of New Zealand. This was a temporary measure until there were sufficient judges to constitute a court of appeal. By 1860, the High Court bench was large enough to sustain a court of appeal, but not large enough to provide a permanent court of appeal.  In 1862 the Court of Appeal was consisted of judges of the High Court on a rotating basis.  It initially sat in Christchurch and Dunedin, and then moved to Wellington when that city became capital in 1865.  The increase in the court's workload and the practical difficulties of High Court judges making themselves available for appellate work, resulted in the call for a permanent court of appeal.  In 1957 the permanent Court of Appeal was established in Wellington with three specifically appointed Court of Appeal judges.  Before the Supreme Court was established, the chief justice was a member of the Court of Appeal by virtue of office, but the permanent complement of the court comprised the President and six permanent members. Today the court consists of the President and nine other judges.   The number of permanent Court members has risen as the volume and complexity of litigation and appeals have increased.  There are now ten permanent members.  The Court of Appeal delivered 628 judgments in 2017.

Former Presidents of the Court of Appeal 
 Hon Stephen Kós, KC 22 July 2016 – 21 April 2022
 Hon Dame Ellen France, DNZM 1 September 2014 – 21 July 2016
 Hon Sir Mark O'Regan, KNZM 1 July 2010 – 1 September 2014
 Hon Sir William Young, KNZM KC 23 February 2006 – 1 July 2010
 Hon Sir Noel Anderson, KNZM QC 1 January 2004 – 23 February 2006
 Rt Hon Sir Thomas Gault, KNZM QC 24 May 2002 – 31 December 2003
 Rt Hon Sir Ivor Richardson, PCNZM QC 17 February 1996 – 23 May 2002
 Rt Hon Sir Robin Cooke, ONZ KBE QC 1 May 1986 – 16 February 1996
 Rt Hon Sir Owen Woodhouse, ONZ KBE DSC 1 May 1981 – 1 May 1986
 Rt Hon Sir Clifford Richmond, KBE 20 May 1976 – 30 April 1981
 Rt Hon Sir Thaddeus McCarthy, ONZ KBE 1 July 1973 – 19 May 1976
 Rt Hon Sir Alexander Turner, KBE QC 1 February 1972 – 29 June 1973
 Rt Hon Sir Alfred North, KBE QC 22 July 1963 – 31 January 1972
 Rt Hon Sir Kenneth Gresson, KBE 23 October 1957 – 17 July 1963

Notable cases of the Court of Appeal  
R v AM [2010] NZCA 114, [2010] 2 NZLR 750 (31 March 2010)
 Tariff judgment providing guidance for judges sentencing defendants for rape and unlawful sexual connection.

R v Harpur [2010] NZCA 319, 24 CRNZ 909 (23 July 2010)
The defendant's conduct in meeting up with a woman with the intention of raping her 4-year old sister was sufficiently proximate conduct to be an attempted sexual violation despite the fact the 4-year old sister did not exist.       
Ridca Central v VM [2011] NZCA 659, [2012] 1 NZLR 641 (19 December 2011) 
 Judgment providing guidance for when orders requiring compulsory care of intellectually disabled persons detained under the Intellectual Disability (Compulsory Care and Rehabilitation) Act 2003 should be extended.  
Ministry of Health v Atkinson [2012] NZCA 184, [2012] 3 NZLR 456 (14 May 2012)
 The Ministry of Health's policy of excluding family members from payment of disability services to their children was unjustified discrimination on the ground of family status.
Hall v R [2015] NZCA 403 (2 September 2015) 
 Judgment providing guidance on the procedure to be adopted for appeals against conviction on the ground that the defendant's counsel at trial made errors in the conduct of the defence.   
R v Harrison [2016] NZCA 381 (10 August 2016)
 Judgment providing interpretation of "manifestly unjust" in relation to the "three strikes" regime contained in the Sentencing and Parole Reform Act 2010.
Attorney-General v Taylor [2017] NZCA 215 (26 May 2017)
 Judgment providing guidance on the voting rights of prisoners.

References

External links 
 The history of the Court of Appeal (courtsofnz.govt.nz)
 The Court of Appeal (justice.govt.nz)

 
New Zealand
New Zealand court system
1862 establishments in New Zealand
1862 in New Zealand
Courts and tribunals established in 1862